The 1986 Masters (officially the 1986 Benson & Hedges Masters) was a professional non-ranking snooker tournament that took place between 26 January and 2 February 1986 at the Wembley Conference Centre in London, England. The top 16 ranked players took part in the competition.

Cliff Thorburn made history in the competition, when he became the first player to retain the title by defeating Jimmy White 9–5 in the final. It was also Thorburn's third and last Masters title.

Earlier in the tournament the last 16 match between Eddie Charlton and Kirk Stevens, which took place on the afternoon of 28 January, had to stop play at 19:20 when the players were level at 4–4 to make way for that day's evening match between Jimmy White and Tony Meo, which was due to start at 19:30. That match started an hour later due to a settling crowd. The White/Meo ended 5–4 to the Whirlwind and then the Charlton/Stevens match resumed just after midnight with Charlton taking the last frame to a 5–4 win, taking him to play Tony Knowles in the quarter-finals, which he lost in another final frame decider 4–5. This was to be Charlton's last Masters appearance as he lost his top 16 place at the end of the season. The same happened with David Taylor too, who lost against Steve Davis in the last 16.

Field
Defending champion Cliff Thorburn was the number 1 seed with World Champion Dennis Taylor seeded 2. The remaining places were allocated to the top 16 players in the world rankings. Silvino Francisco was making his debut in the Masters.

Main draw

Final

Century breaks
Total: 5
 138, 110  Willie Thorne
 132  Steve Davis
 106  Jimmy White
 101  Eddie Charlton

References

Masters (snooker)
Masters Snooker
Masters Snooker
January 1986 sports events in the United Kingdom
Masters